The 2008 Governor General's Awards for Literary Merit: Finalists in 14 categories (73 books) were announced October 21, winners announced November 18.  The prize for writers and illustrators was $25,000 and "a specially bound copy of the winning book".

Controversy

The Canada Council for the Arts, the award program's administrator, faced some criticism around its nomination of the graphic novel Skim in the Children's Literature category. The nomination was credited to Mariko Tamaki, who wrote the graphic novel's text, but not to her cousin and co-creator Jillian Tamaki, who drew the illustrations.

Two prominent Canadian graphic novelists, Chester Brown and Seth, circulated an open letter to the Canada Council asking them to revise the nomination, arguing that unlike a more traditional illustrated book, a graphic novel's text and illustration are inseparable parts of the work's narrative, and that both women should accordingly be credited as equal co-authors. Their letter was also endorsed by other prominent Canadian and American graphic novelists, including Lynda Barry, Dan Clowes, Art Spiegelman, Chris Ware and Julie Doucet, as well as by Chris Oliveros of Canadian comic and graphic novel publisher Drawn & Quarterly and Peter Birkemore of Toronto comic store The Beguiling.

Melanie Rutledge, a spokesperson for the Canada Council, responded that it was too late to revise the nominations for the 2008 awards, but that the council would take the feedback into account in the future.

The Canada Council later faced controversy over its selection of Jacob Scheier's More to Keep Us Warm as the winner in the poetry category. Di Brandt, one of the poetry award's jurors, was credited by Scheier as a friend and mentor in the book's creation, resulting in debate over whether Brandt should have recused herself from the judging panel.

English

French

References

Governor General's Awards
Governor General's Awards
Governor General's Awards